Libmanan, officially the Municipality of Libmanan, is a 1st class municipality in the province of Camarines Sur, Philippines. According to the 2020 census, it has a population of 112,994 people. Libmanan is the largest municipality in Camarines Sur in terms of population, and the second largest in terms of land area.

The municipality's history dates back to before the beginning of Spanish colonization, and its city center is home to a number of beautiful historic Art Deco buildings including the palatial Morales Ruins which soar over the road entering Libmanan proper.

History

Libmanan was a barrio of Quipayo in 1580 with the name of "Pinaglabanan". Records from a historian Mauro B. Avila, revealed that the municipality was named Libmanan on September 15, 1574. Missionaries started working in Libmanan in 1589 and the area's church was dedicated to St. James the Apostle.

German ethnographer Fedor Jagor described visiting Libmanan in his 1875 work "Travels in the Philippines", wherein he visited the local parish priest and learned from him about an ancient human settlement that had been dug up in 1851 during road construction in the Poro area of the southwest close near the Tres Marias islands: the excavation consisted of "numerous remains of the early inhabitants—skulls, ribs, bones of men and animals, a child’s thighbone inserted in a spiral of brass wire, several stags’ horns, beautifully-formed dishes and vessels, some of them painted, probably of Chinese origin; striped bracelets, of a soft, gypseous, copper-red rock, gleaming as if they were varnished; small copper knives, but no iron utensils; and several broad flat stones bored through the middle; besides a wedge of petrified wood, embedded in a cleft branch of a tree."

During the occupation of their country by the United States, the Philippine Legislature greatly expanded the network of railroads throughout the island of Luzon, and a railway headed to the city of Legazpi, Albay and Naga, Camarines Sur was built through Libmanan to provide direct access to those cities. This railway was damaged severely during World War II, but partially restored using American funds thereafter, providing transportation service down the Bicol Peninsula off and on until ending in 2012 despite plans to rehabilitate the route.

The historic Morales Ruins Art Deco mansion at the heart of the town was built in 1937 by the Rev. Friar Mariano Roldan for his parents, and was eventually sold to the Morales family whose name the ruins now bear. It is noted for art deco frescos which are emblematic of the period in which it was built, one of which includes a defiantly displayed Filipino national flag, which would have been disallowed by the American and Japanese occupiers of the time.

Even during the time of the Spaniards, the town of Libmanan was already considered the "rice basket" of the province. This generous production of rice is attributed to the fertile soil and the town's abundant water supply. In 1991 the area's irrigation canals (shared with its northern neighbor Cabusao, Camarines Sur) were sufficient to water 2996 hectares of land during the dry season.

Barangay Poblacion is often referred by locals as "Libmanan" while the surrounding urban Barangays are referred to as "Metropolitan Libmanan" or "Greater Poblacion Area" unofficial.

Important Dates & Events

The first name of town was "Piglabanan".
March 18, 1484: Invasion of the Moros; those who killed were buried beside the Present Church.
February 1572: Construction of the First Church.
September 15, 1574: Changing the town name from Piglabanan to Libmanan by fray Bartolome Cabello.
1586-1589: Construction of the Second Church of Libmanan.
1732: Start of the first town government of Libmanan.
1838: Construction of Catholic Cemetery In Barangay Puro Batia.
1903: Founding of the first public schools.
1915: Construction of the municipal cemetery In Barangay Puro Batia.
1921: Construction of the Rizal Monument.
1927: Passing of the MRR Co. in Libmanan.
1929: Construction of MRR Co. (Philippine National Railways) Bridge.
1930-31: Installation of the water system.
1933: Construction of first and second market pavilion.
1939-40: Construction of a concrete municipal hall under Mayor Francisco Frondozo.
1941: Construction of the post office under Mayor Teodoro Dilanco
March 3, 1951: Naming of Barangay Bagumbayan by Municipal Council.
1954-57: Construction of the municipal irrigation system.
1955: Renaming the streets of the Poblacion and improvement of the Town Plaza.
1956: Construction of the 30-Door Market.
May 1957: Dredging of the Libmanan River
1957: Construction of a two-story building for the private Central School and also a public toilet.
March 1961: Construction of the concrete Easter tower under Mayor Amadeo Castaneda.
1978: Construction of the Bulaong Bridge.
1993: Construction of the Libmanan Town Arc in Barangay Potot.
September 2020: Redevelopment of Market in the Poblacion Area
2021 to 22: Developments and redevelopments of roads both in rural and urban areas.
February 2023: Filing for cityhood by Mayor Jess Camara.

Geography

Libmanan has 3 sectors built up areas, flat land areas and mountainous land. 13,940 ha are flat land 19,239 ha are mountainous land and the remaining 1,103 ha are built up areas. Totalling in 34,282 hectares. 

Libmanan is a large municipality, one of the biggest in Camarines Sur. It stretched across nearly the whole width of the Bicol peninsula, from where it borders Cabusao Municipality on the San Miguel Bay all the way out to the Ragay Gulf, including three islands known locally as the 'tres Marias', including one island known as 'puro island'. The main town, or 'poblacion', is located along the Libmanan River on the lowland alluvial plain adjacent to Cabusao.

Heading to the southern coast from the poblacion the municipality becomes hilly. In this hilly region between the poblacion and the highway lies the Libmanan Caves National Park. Continuing on towards the coast from the hills, the municipality becomes truly mountainous beginning in Barangay Malinao beyond the Pan-Philippine Highway, where the "Boro-Boro Spring Resort" is located; a series of waterfalls that are a locally popular swimming destination. Beyond Malinao the upland region features the mountain 'Mount Bernacci (Tancong Vaca' - in the local dialect meaning 'the cow's hump') - which is a local landmark visible from most locations on the Pan-Philippine Highway in western Camarines Sur and was a base of operations for local guerrillas fighting the Japanese during World War II. Up to the present day, the area around Tancong Vaca has remained an area of conflict between anti-government insurgents and the Philippine National Police.

The municipality's rural barangays lie behind Mount Bernacci, and mostly lack access to paved roads, of which there is only one which terminates in the fishing village of Barangay Bahao, within sight of the tres Marias.

Climate

Barangays
Libmanan is politically subdivided into 75 barangays; five of which are located in the coastal areas and the remaining 70 barangays are distributed in the low land and upland portions of the municipality. The road leading to Poblacion and other major baranggays is marked by a memorial for the Ten Outstanding Young Men trophy awarded to a past mayor and local hero, Jose Bulaong.

Demographics

Religion
The religious needs of its people and those of neighboring towns prompted the erection of the Prelature of Libmanan in 1990 and installation the first bishop, Msgr. Prospero N. Arellano .  On 25 March 2009 Pope Benedict XVI elevated the prelature to become a diocese with Bishop Jose Rojas Rojas becoming its first bishop.

The Catholic Bishops' Conference of the Philippines lists the following Catholic church parishes of Libmanan:

Economy 

Libmanan, one of the largest and most populous municipality in the province, benefits from the transportation being offered by the Libmanan River, the railroad and the national highway. Though rail service through Libmanan no longer connects directly to Manila there are still commuter trips available bringing passengers to nearby Naga, Camarines Sur and the route that was reopened in 2015 bringing them all the way to Legazpi, Albay.

Generally, Libmanan soil is adapted for growing different agricultural products. Portions are also adopted to pottery-the making of which has been a local industry for centuries. Libmanan has been the “rice-basket” not only of the province but of Southern Luzon-even during the Spanish regime. In spite of problems encountered by rice farmers, Libmanan maintains its status of being the rice granary of the province.

Libmanan is the heart of the provinces of Camarines Sur, Quezon and Camarines Norte making the municipality the rice basket of Southern Luzon, other than these provinces products can also reach Metro Manila.

Barangays of Bahao, Mambulo Nuevo, San Isidro, Bahay and Sibujo act as rural financial centers. 

Rural areas are mostly dependent on agriculture and aquaculture, in the Poblacion District  however, there is an identified mini business district with the new public market and the LCC Supermarket with other small restaurants, banks, mini shops.

Infrastructure 

Libmanan is connected to Naga City through the Pan Philippine highway or AH26. The Poblacíon can be accessed through Bagacay Road (From South) and the Main Libmanan road (from North). Libmanan has 4 main roads longest one is the Pan Philippine highway that stretches from Beguito Viejo to Mambulo Nuevo second one is Libmanan Canaman Cabusao road that runs from Poblacion Area of Libmanan to Cabusao. Third is Bagacay Road that runs from Barangay Bagacay to the intersection of Libmanan road.The western and coastal Barangays can be reached through the new Bahao road that was constructed in 2019 this road not only serves as an enhancement to tourism but also to trade and industry, however some barangays of Libmanan still need an improvement on road infrastructure otherwise those Barangays will progress slow or even stagnant economy.

Heritage
The town possess one of the most important cultural examples of ancestral houses in western Camarines Sur. Among these architectural marvels are the 1920s municipal hall building with its arcade-embellished facade, the 1875 Dilanco House which is the oldest structure in the town and was home to three former municipal mayors, the 1937 Morales Ruins which is the most culturally-important Art Deco building in the town, the Nacieno House which is another Art Deco ancestral house, and the 1926 Jaucian House Jose Jaucian Sr. Another ancestral house that was demolished in the late 1970s is the house built by Don Celedonio Reyes, it was demolished to make way for more modern buildings opf the Bicol Central Academy.

Most heritage houses in the town have already been abandoned, including the Morales Ruins, Nacieno House, and the Dilanco  House. In 2013, a campaign was administered by some locals to transform the Morales Ruins into a municipal museum, along with other heritage houses in the town to spur a heritage-based tourism industry and to conserve the remaining immovable cultural heritage of the town.

Government

List of former chief executives

Education 
The Department of Education (Philippines) lists the following schools for Libmanan:

Tertiary
 CASIFMAS (Libmanan Campus) - Potot, Libmanan
 Luis H. Dilanco Sr. Foundation College, Inc. - Bahay, Libmanan
Secondary
 Colegio del Santisimo Rosario - Station Church Site, Libmanan
 Bicol Central Academy - Libod 1,Libmanan
 Central Bicol State University Sipocot - Libmanan Extension College (formerly: Bicol Institute of Science and Technology - Libmanan Extension College- Sibujo, Libmanan)
 Bahay Provincial High School- Bahay,Libmanan
 San Juan National High School - Handong, Libmanan
 San Isidro National High School - San Isidro, Libmanan
 Bahao National High School - Bahao, Libmanan
 Carmel National High School - Potot, Libmanan 
 Pag-oring Nuevo National High School - Pag-oring Nuevo, Libmanan
 Malansad Nuevo National High School - Malansad, Libmanan
 Mambulo Nuevo National High School - Mambulo Nuevo, Libmanan
Intermediate
 Libmanan North Central School - Libod # 2
 Candato Elementary School - Candato, Libmanan
 Libmanan South Central School
 Tarum Elementary School
 Ibid Elementary School - Ibid, Libmanan
 Umalo Elementary School - Umalo, Libmanan
 Fundado Elementary School- Taban-Fundado,Libmanan
 St. Joseph Academy - Potot, Libmanan
 Don Jose Ursua Elementary School - Malinao, Libmanan
 Bikal Elementary School- Bikal, Libmanan
 Duang Niog Elementary School-Duang Niog, Libmanan
 Sixto Bulaong Elementary School- Busak, Libmanan
 Mambulo Nuevo Elementary School - Mambulo Nuevo, Libmanan
 San Juan Elementary School - Handong, Libmanan
 Malansad Nuevo Elementary School, Malansad Nuevo Elementary School

References

External links

Official Site of the Diocese of Libmanan
[ Philippine Standard Geographic Code]
Philippine Census Information
Official Site of the Province of Camarines Sur

Municipalities of Camarines Sur